Murray Norcross Shelton (April 20, 1893 – August 14, 1985) was an American football player.

Born in Dunkirk, New York, Shelton graduated from Cornell University in 1916 and was a member of the Sphinx Head Society. In 1973, he was elected to the College Football Hall of Fame. In 1984, he was also inducted into Chautauqua Sports Hall of Fame.

Shelton died on August 14, 1985 in Columbia, Missouri. He was 92.

External links
 
 Murray Shelton at Chautauqua Sports Hall of Fame

1893 births
1985 deaths
Buffalo All-Americans players
Cornell Big Red football players
All-American college football players
American football ends
College Football Hall of Fame inductees
People from Dunkirk, New York
Players of American football from New York (state)